Porąbka  is a village in Bielsko County, Silesian Voivodeship, in southern Poland. It is the seat of the gmina (administrative district) called Gmina Porąbka. The settlement originates from early 15th century, first mentioned in 1445 as part of the Duchy of Oświęcim.

The village has a population of 3,852.

Gallery

References

Villages in Bielsko County
Kingdom of Galicia and Lodomeria
Kraków Voivodeship (1919–1939)